Fleet Services is a motorway service station on the M3 near Fleet. It is owned by Welcome Break.

History
Opened in 1973, it was originally built in a Scandinavian style and in 1992 won Loo of the Year Award. Before 2001, when Winchester services opened, it was the only service station on the M3. 

In 2006, it was one of the first service stations to carry the new corporate identity for Welcome Break, and along with it came a new Burger King franchise, which then made Fleet Services one of the few motorway service stations to have a Burger King, a KFC and a McDonald's co-exist at the same service station. The McDonald's was part of a 1995 Welcome Break campaign to roll out franchises throughout its chain, but when Welcome Break's parent company was taken over by Granada, the latter's rival franchise of Burger King was instead introduced throughout the chain, but Fleet services (and Woodall), part of the original plan, continued to carry McDonald's despite this. However, the McDonald's closed in March 2020, owing to licensing agreements.

Fleet cheat
Fleet services were well known for the 'Fleet cheat'  in which drivers took a back exit to the northbound side, which is meant for access by authorised vehicles only (as indicated by two no-entry signs with the aforementioned exception information underneath it), from Pale Lane in order to avoid traffic queues from the motorway. Because of a loophole in legislation, in which the original purpose of the signs cannot be enforced as if it were part of a public highway, thereby only falling under trespassing, people that took the 'Fleet cheat' could not be prosecuted in the normal way for violating these signs. In the 2000s, bollards were installed to prevent unauthorised access, but these bollards often malfunctioned, so ANPR cameras were added in July 2010, which then signalled the end of the 'Fleet cheat'.

Chapter 6 [Part I] of Joseph Rogers' short biographical Running. Nothing. Something. details walking the Fleet cheat to nearby Elvetham Heath.

Scott Mills Bridge

The Scott Mills Bridge was officially named on 16 March 2016. The naming followed a campaign by the Scott Mills Show's co-presenter Chris Stark to get things named after the BBC Radio 1 presenter. A plaque was unveiled at the site by Stark.

2016 fire
A large fire broke out, caused by a faulty coffee machine in KFC on the evening of 14 December 2016, damaging at least 60% of the building but not resulting in any human injuries. The southbound carriageway of the M3 was closed and more than 100 firefighters attended from Hampshire and Surrey. A customer on site at the time the fire broke out said it appeared to have started in a coffee machine and that staff reacted slowly.

A temporary building opened on 23 March 2017 to serve as the southbound services whilst the fire damaged building was demolished and rebuilt. The rebuilt services building opened on 6 September 2018 and included Burger King, KFC, Pizza Express, Tossed, Harry Ramsdens, WHSmith and Little Waitrose. Additionally a number of Tesla and Ecotricity charging stations are being installed in the car parking area. Tossed and Harry Ramsdens were removed in 2020 and were replaced by Chopstix Noodle Bar and The Good Breakfast.

References

External links 
Welcome Break Official Site - Fleet
Motorway Services Online - Fleet
Motorway Services Area Trivia - Fleet

M3 motorway service stations
Welcome Break motorway service stations
1973 establishments in England
Transport in Hampshire
Hart District